The Claremont Warehouse No. 34 is a historic warehouse building at Heritage Drive in Claremont, New Hampshire. Built in 1912 for the Sullivan Machine Company, it is one of the city's reminders of that company's importance as a major economic force in the region. The building was listed on the National Register of Historic Places in 1979.

Description and history
When built, the structure had an open interior with a single floor and three mezzanine levels, with a tall three-story opening at one end, and was covered by a sawtooth roof.

The building was designed by Arthur S. Coffin and built in 1912 by the Sullivan Machinery Company, a local manufacturer of quarrying and mining equipment. It was used primarily as a warehouse until 1967, also including a welding shop for a time. A rail line ran directly into the building, facilitating the loading and unloading of materials. It was purchased in 1974 by a mattress manufacturer. A large portion of the adjacent Sullivan Company plant (located between this building and the Sugar River) was destroyed by fire in 1979. It has since been converted to residential use.

See also
National Register of Historic Places listings in Sullivan County, New Hampshire

References

Industrial buildings and structures on the National Register of Historic Places in New Hampshire
Buildings and structures completed in 1912
Buildings and structures in Claremont, New Hampshire
1912 establishments in New Hampshire
National Register of Historic Places in Sullivan County, New Hampshire